Arago is an impact crater in the Arabia quadrangle on Mars at 10.22 N and 29.93° E. It is  in diameter and is in the northernmost part of Terra Sabaea. Its name was approved in 1973 and refers to the French astronomer François Arago.

Arago is highly eroded and subdued and is thus ancient. Arago is believed to have once held a giant lake that drained into the  Naktong-Scamander-Mamers lake-chain system. Naktong Vallis is to the south of Arago and Scamander Vallis is to the north. Water flowed from the south to the north and pooled in Arago and also in the larger Tikhonravov crater to the northeast of Arago.

Henry crater is to the west of Arago, and Barth is to the southwest.

References 

Impact craters on Mars
Arabia quadrangle